is a passenger railway station located in the city of  Yokosuka, Kanagawa Prefecture, Japan, operated by the private railway company Keikyū.

Lines
Keikyū Ōtsu Station is served by the Keikyū Main Line and is located 53.1 kilometers from the northern terminus of the line at Shinagawa  Station in Tokyo.

Station layout
The station consists of two opposed side platforms connected to the station building by a footbridge.

Platforms

History
It was renamed  on November 1, 1963, and renamed to its present name on June 1, 1987.

Keikyū introduced station numbering to its stations on 21 October 2010; Keikyū Ōtsu Station was assigned station number KK62.

Passenger statistics
In fiscal 2019, the station was used by an average of 4,943 passengers daily. 

The passenger figures for previous years are as shown below.

Surrounding area
 Yokosuka City Otsu Elementary School
Yokosuka City Otsu Junior High School
Kanagawa Prefectural Yokosuka Otsu High School

See also
 List of railway stations in Japan

References

External links

 

Railway stations in Kanagawa Prefecture
Railway stations in Japan opened in 1930
Keikyū Main Line
Railway stations in Yokosuka, Kanagawa